In mathematics, a trinomial expansion is the expansion of a power of a sum of three terms into monomials. The expansion is given by

where  is a nonnegative integer and the sum is taken over all combinations of nonnegative indices  and  such that . The trinomial coefficients are given by

The coefficients can be defined with a generalization of Pascal's triangle to three dimensions, called Pascal's pyramid or Pascal's tetrahedron.

Properties 
The number of terms of an expanded trinomial is the triangular number

where  is the exponent to which the trinomial is raised.

Example 

See also
 Binomial expansion
 Pascal's pyramid
 Multinomial coefficient
 Trinomial triangle

References

Factorial and binomial topics